John White (1748–1813) was a property developer and surveyor to the Duke of Portland who was responsible for the development of the Duke's land in Marylebone, including Harley Street and what subsequently became Regent's Park.

References

External links 

http://discovery.nationalarchives.gov.uk/details/rd/e95b474c-3206-4658-a9b9-96460bbe0795
http://discovery.nationalarchives.gov.uk/details/rd/50cad84f-7d85-4824-9708-08dd3b807857
http://discovery.nationalarchives.gov.uk/details/rd/a033152e-319d-42bd-9f5d-2f5fe598d653

1748 births
1813 deaths
British surveyors
Marylebone